Statistics of Division 2 in the 1968–69 season.

Overview
It was contested by 21 teams, and Angers won the championship.

League standings

References
France - List of final tables (RSSSF)

Ligue 2 seasons
French
2